Input may refer to:

Computing
 Input (computer science), the act of entering data into a computer or data processing system
 Information, any data entered into a computer or data processing system
 Input device
 Input method
 Input port (disambiguation)
 Input/output (I/O), in computing

Other
 Input (talk show)
 Input (typeface)
 International Public Television Screening Conference (INPUT), an international public television organization
 Input (online magazine), an online technology and culture magazine owned by Bustle Digital Group

See also
 
 Independent variable in a mathematical function
 In economics, a factor of production, a resource employed to produce goods and services
 Advice (opinion)
 Impute (disambiguation)
 Output (disambiguation)